Nemanja Cvetković (Serbian Cyrillic: Немања Цветковић; born 8 February 1980) is a retired Serbian football right back.

External links
 Profile at Srbijafudbal
 
 

1980 births
Living people
Footballers from Belgrade
Serbian footballers
Association football defenders
Serbian expatriate footballers
Expatriate footballers in Poland
Expatriate footballers in Switzerland
Expatriate footballers in Belgium
Expatriate footballers in Belarus
Serbian expatriate sportspeople in Poland
Serbian SuperLiga players
FK Mladi Radnik players
FK Čukarički players
FK Vojvodina players
FK Obilić players
Radomiak Radom players
FK Smederevo players
FC Wohlen players
FC Winterthur players
Union Royale Namur Fosses-La-Ville players
Red Star Belgrade footballers
FC Neman Grodno players